Maria Desylla-Kapodistria (1898–1980) was the mayor of Corfu from 1956 until 1959. Her election to mayor on 15 April 1956, made her the first woman elected mayor of a city in the history of modern Greece. She donated the land on which the Kapodistrias Museum, established in 1981 in memory of her ancestor Ioannis Kapodistrias, considered the founder of the modern Greek state, lies today.

References

Mayors of Corfu (city)
Women mayors of places in Greece
1898 births
1980 deaths
20th-century Greek women politicians
Kapodistrias family
Politicians from Athens